Pierra Menta is a mountain of Savoie, France. It lies in the Beaufortain Massif range. It has an elevation of 2,714 metres above sea level.

Mountains of the Alps
Mountains of Savoie